Capt. John Halstead Farm is a historic home and farm located near Kesslers Cross Lanes, Nicholas County, West Virginia.  It was built about 1876, and is a two-story side gable with a rear gable two-story wing. It features a full-length, two-story porch on the front of the house and one on the side of the wing in the rear. Also on the property are a contributing gable-roofed tool shed, a small barn, a long narrow chicken coop, an outhouse, and a large barn.  It is an example of the local type of residence and subsistence farm.

It was listed on the National Register of Historic Places in 1998.

References

Houses on the National Register of Historic Places in West Virginia
Houses completed in 1876
Houses in Nicholas County, West Virginia
National Register of Historic Places in Nicholas County, West Virginia
Farms on the National Register of Historic Places in West Virginia